Franz Rumpler (4 December 1848, Tachau - 7 March 1922, Klosterneuburg) was an Austrian genre and landscape painter.

Biography 

He was the son of Johann Baptist Rumpler (1807–1876), a wood carver, and brother of Johann Rumpler, the Younger (1845–1918), a wood sculptor. His first lessons came from his father. After displaying unusual talent, he was sent to Vienna for further study, at the age of fifteen, and received several prizes for his work.

He attracted the attention of Cardinal Friedrich Prince zu Schwarzenberg and, with his financial support, was able to study at the Academy of Fine Arts with Eduard von Engerth. From 1871 to 1875, he made several study trips to Italy. During this time, he also took lessons from Hans Makart. He made another study trip to France in 1879.

During the 1890s, he served as a Professor of history painting at the Academy. In 1897, he held his largest exhibition, with over 230 works, and was named an honorary citizen in his hometown of Tachau.

In 1904, he settled in Klosterneuburg, where he came under the influence of the Barbizon school and founded the "Klosterneuburger Künstlerbundes" (Artists' association). He also promoted the careers of promising young artists, such as  Egon Schiele. Later, he became a member of the "Society for the Promotion of German Science, Arts and Literature in Bohemia" and was named a Hofrat; a position he held until the title was abolished in 1919. He was awarded the Order of the Iron Crown, Third Class, in 1908.

He died in 1922 and was interred at the Wiener Zentralfriedhof.

Legacy
In 1929, following the death of his wife, Marie, his estate was auctioned off and the proceeds donated to various charities for the blind. A street in the Viennese district of Ottakring was named after him in 1936.

Selected paintings

References

Further reading 
 
 Josef Weinmann: Egerländer Biografisches Lexikon mit ausgewählten Personen des ehemaligen Regierungs-Bezirkes Eger. Männedorf/ZH 1987, pg.123.
 
 Ferdinand Seibt, Hans Lemberg, Helmut Slapnicka: Biographisches Lexikon zur Geschichte der böhmischen Länder. Herausgegeben im Auftrag des Collegium Carolinum, Vol. III, R. Oldenbourg Verlag, 2000, pg.546.

External links 

 More works by Rumpler @ ArtNet
 

Austrian genre painters
19th-century Austrian painters
19th-century Austrian male artists
Austrian male painters
20th-century Austrian painters
1848 births
1922 deaths
Burials at the Vienna Central Cemetery
People from Tachov
German Bohemian people
Austrian people of German Bohemian descent
20th-century Austrian male artists